Kenneth Brian Cloude (born January 9, 1975) is a former Major League Baseball player. He was a pitcher for the Seattle Mariners from -. He made his major league debut in 1997, pitching in 10 games (9 starts) for Seattle.

He won a spot in the rotation in 1998 and finished the season with a disastrous 6.37 ERA in 30 starts. 1999 was much worse as Cloude had a 7.96 ERA in 31 games. He did not pitch in 2000 because of injury. He spent half the season in AAA. He missed the whole 2001 season because of surgery. He pitched in the minors for 3 seasons after surgery but did not get a callup in any season.

Personal life
Ken Cloude was born in Baltimore, Maryland on January 9, 1975. He was drafted by the Seattle Mariners.

External links

1975 births
Living people
Seattle Mariners players
Baseball players from Maryland
Major League Baseball pitchers
Arizona League Mariners players
Wisconsin Timber Rattlers players
Lancaster JetHawks players
Memphis Chicks players
Tacoma Rainiers players
Durham Bulls players